Moschato-Tavros is a municipality in the South Athens regional unit, Attica, Greece. The seat of the municipality is the town Moschato. The municipality has an area of 4.450 km2.

Municipality
The municipality Moschato-Tavros was formed at the 2011 local government reform by the merger of two former municipalities, that became municipal units:
Moschato
Tavros

References

Municipalities of Attica
Populated places in South Athens (regional unit)